George Blair  (December 6, 1905 – April 19, 1970) was an American film director who worked generally on supporting features including many B-Westerns. Two of his earliest films were British-set thriller films starring C. Aubrey Smith, made for Republic Pictures.

Selected filmography
Director
 Secrets of Scotland Yard (1944)
 A Sporting Chance (1945)
 Scotland Yard Investigator (1945)
 Gangs of the Waterfront (1945)
 Affairs of Geraldine (1946)
 That's My Gal (1947)
 The Trespasser (1947)
 Exposed (1947)
 Madonna of the Desert (1948)
 Lightnin' in the Forest (1948)
 King of the Gamblers (1948)
 Daredevils of the Clouds (1948)
 Homicide for Three (1948)
 Rose of the Yukon (1949)
 Duke of Chicago (1949)
 Streets of San Francisco (1949)
 Under Mexicali Stars (1950)
 Silver City Bonanza (1951)
 Secrets of Monte Carlo (1951)
 Desert Pursuit (1952)
 Perils of the Jungle (1953)
 Superman in Scotland Yard (1954)
Sabu and the Magic Ring (1957)
The Hypnotic Eye (1960)

TV series
 Adventures of Superman (1953-1958, TV series, 27 episodes
 Casey Jones (1957-1958, TV series, 23 episodes)
 Highway Patrol (1957, TV series, 2 episodes)
 Harbor Command (1958, TV series, 1 episode)
 Tales of the Texas Rangers (1958, TV series, 7 episodes)
 Death Valley Days (1959, TV series, 1 episode)
 Lassie (1959–1960, TV series, 3 episodes)
 Bonanza (1960, TV series, 1 episode)
 Wanted: Dead or Alive (1960, TV series, 10 episodes)
 Stagecoach West (1961, TV series, 2 episodes)
 The Littlest Hobo (1963, TV series, 1 episode)
 The Adventures of Superboy (1996, TV series)

TV shorts
 Beach Patrol (1959, TV short)
 The Adventures of Superboy (1961, TV short)

Bibliography
 Richards, Jeffrey. Visions of Yesterday. Routledge, 1973.

External links

1905 births
1970 deaths
American film directors
American film producers
20th-century American businesspeople